Atri a small village in the Khurda district of Odisha.

Atri is around 15 km west of Khurda. The nearest airport is at Bhubaneswar. Nearest railhead is Khurda Road Junction Railway Station. Atri is famous for its perennial hot spring. The hot spring is reputed to have therapeutic properties which are used by visitors for the cure of skin diseases. The water of the hot spring (57 °C) contains small doses of sulphur flavour when heated to 100 °C.

There is a Bathing Complex of Govt. of Odisha at Atri. Not far from the Hot spring there is a shrine of Lord Hattakeswar Mahadev. The temple is the venue of a grand annual fair, Makar Jatra, on the day of Makar Sankranti (mid January). On this day the visitors congregate in large numbers to worship Lord Hatkeshwar to fulfill their desires and they also bathe in the ponds hoping to cure their diseases.

Gallery

References

External links
Atri – Hot Spring of Khordha, Odisha
 Atri, The famous Hot Spring of Odisha
 Atri – Hot Spring of Khordha, Odisha

Hot springs of Odisha
Villages in Khordha district
Tourism in Odisha
Tourist attractions in Odisha